André Filipe Costa Oliveira Fernandes, known as André Costa (born 24 May 1995) is a Portuguese footballer who plays as a goalkeeper.

Football career
On 12 May 2017, Costa made his professional debut with Vitória Guimarães B in a 2016–17 LigaPro match against FC Porto B.

References

External links

Stats and profile at LPFP 

André Costa at ZeroZero

1995 births
Living people
People from Vila Real, Portugal
Portuguese footballers
Association football goalkeepers
Campeonato de Portugal (league) players
C.D. Estarreja players
Vitória S.C. B players
Anadia F.C. players
SC São João de Ver players
Liga Portugal 2 players
Sportspeople from Vila Real District